Tony Estanguet  (born 6 May 1978 in Pau) is a French slalom canoeist and a three-time Olympic champion in C1. He competed at the international level from 1994 to 2012.

Racing career

Estanguet won three Olympic gold medals in the C1 event in 2000, 2004 and 2012. At the 2004 games in Athens he won the gold medal after a late judges decision to award a 2-second penalty to Michal Martikán.

Estanguet was the flag-bearer for France at the 2008 Beijing Summer Olympics opening ceremony. He finished in the 9th position (out of 12 competitors; only the first eight would qualify for the final) in the semi-finals of the C1 event and was thus eliminated from the final.

At the 2012 London Summer Olympics, he became the first French Olympian to win three gold medals in the same Olympic discipline.

He won twelve medals at the ICF Canoe Slalom World Championships with five golds (C1: 2006, 2009, 2010; C1 team: 2005, 2007), six silvers (C1: 2003, 2005, 2007; C1 team: 1997, 2003, 2009), and a bronze (C1 team: 1999).

Estanguet won the overall World Cup title in C1 in 2003 and 2004. He also won a total of ten medals at the European Championships (4 golds, 3 silvers and 3 bronzes).

Together with his brother Patrice, he developed the Pau-Pyrénées Whitewater Stadium (opened in 2008) in their home town of Pau.

He announced his retirement on 30 November 2012.

World Cup individual podiums

1 World Championship counting for World Cup points
2 European Championship counting for World Cup points
3 Pan American Championship counting for World Cup points

Education
Estanguet graduated from French business school ESSEC, specializing in sports marketing.

Family
Tony is the son of Henri Estanguet, himself a canoeist who won medals at the Wildwater Canoe World Championships in the 1970s. His older brother Patrice won a bronze medal at the 1996 Summer Olympics in Atlanta.

Post-racing career & Paris 2024 Olympic Organizing Committee
In 2012 Estanguet was elected to the IOC Athletes' Commission. He will serve as an IOC member for eight years. He successfully led Paris's bid for the 2024 Summer Olympics and is serving as the head of the organizing committee for those games.

References

2010 ICF Canoe Slalom World Championships 12 September 2010 C1 men's final results. – Retrieved 12 September 2010.
12 September 2009 final results of the men's C1 team slalom event for the 2009 ICF Canoe Slalom World Championships. – Retrieved 12 September 2009.
13 September 2009 final results of the men's C1 event at the 2009 ICF Canoe Slalom World Championships. – Retrieved 13 September 2009.
DatabaseOlympics.com profile

External links

	
	

1978 births
Canoeists at the 2000 Summer Olympics
Canoeists at the 2004 Summer Olympics
Canoeists at the 2008 Summer Olympics
Canoeists at the 2012 Summer Olympics
French male canoeists
Living people
Olympic canoeists of France
Olympic gold medalists for France
Olympic medalists in canoeing
Chevaliers of the Légion d'honneur
International Olympic Committee members
Medalists at the 2012 Summer Olympics
Medalists at the 2004 Summer Olympics
European champions for France
Medalists at the 2000 Summer Olympics
Presidents of the Organising Committees for the Olympic Games
Medalists at the ICF Canoe Slalom World Championships
Sportspeople from Pau, Pyrénées-Atlantiques